Al-Ittihad Club may refer to:

 Al-Ittihad Club (Salalah), an Omani sports club based in Salalah, Oman
 Al-Ittihad Club (Jeddah), a Saudi Premier League football club based in Jeddah
 Al-Ittihad Club (Nablus), a Palestinian football club based in Nablus 
 Al-Ittihad Club (Tripoli), a Libyan football club based in Bab Ben Gashier, Tripoli, Libya